The Control Revolution is a book by James Beniger that explains the origins of the information society in part from the need to manage and control the production of an industrial society.
 The book received the Association of American Publishers Award for the Most Outstanding Book in the Social and Behavioral Sciences and the Phi Kappa Phi Faculty Recognition Award. The late Dr. Beniger was a professor at the University of Southern California.

Further reading

References 

1989 non-fiction books
Information society